Navakh or Navokh may refer to:
 Navakh, Gilan
 Navakh, Chenaran, Razavi Khorasan Province
 Navakh, Quchan, Razavi Khorasan Province